Apfelstädt is a river which flows for 34 km through Thuringia, Germany.

Geography 

The source of the Apfelstädt is around 5 km south-west of Tambach-Dietharz at an elevation of 728 m. The Apfelstädt marks the western boundary of the Elbe river system in the Thuringian Forest. Its main tributary is the Ohra, which joins it just north of Ohrdruf. The river flows into the Gera close to the town of Ingersleben.

See also
List of rivers of Thuringia

Rivers of Thuringia
Rivers of Germany